Roman Ragozin (born January 4, 1993 in Ridder) is a Kazakhstani cross-country skier.

Ragozin competed at the 2014 Winter Olympics for Kazakhstan. He placed 33rd in the qualifying round in the sprint, failing to advance to the knockout stages.

Ragozin made his World Cup debut in December 2013. As of April 2014, his best finish is a 22nd, in a freestyle sprint event at Szklarska Poreba in 2013–14. His best World Cup overall finish is 140th, in 2013–14. His best World Cup finish in a discipline is 87th, in the 2013–14 sprint.

References

1993 births
Living people
People from Ridder, Kazakhstan
Olympic cross-country skiers of Kazakhstan
Cross-country skiers at the 2014 Winter Olympics
Kazakhstani male cross-country skiers
Competitors at the 2015 Winter Universiade
21st-century Kazakhstani people